The Gonocarpus of William Hamilton ("Ham.") is a synonym of Combretum.

Gonocarpus (raspwort) is a genus of flowering plants in the family Haloragaceae. The species, which are native to Australia, New Zealand and Malesia, include:
Gonocarpus acanthocarpus (Brongn.) Orchard 
Gonocarpus benthamii  Orchard  
Gonocarpus chinensis (Lour.) Orchard 
Gonocarpus confertifolius  (F.Muell.) Orchard  
Gonocarpus cordiger  (Fenzl) Nees  
Gonocarpus diffusus  (Diels) Orchard  
Gonocarpus effusus  Orchard  
Gonocarpus elatus  (A.Cunn. ex Fenzl) Orchard  - hill raspwort, tall raspwort
Gonocarpus ephemerus  Orchard  
Gonocarpus eremophilus  Orchard  
Gonocarpus ericifolius  Orchard  
Gonocarpus hexandrus  (F.Muell.) Orchard  
Gonocarpus hirtus  Orchard  
Gonocarpus hispidus  Orchard  
Gonocarpus humilis  Orchard  - shade raspwort
Gonocarpus implexus  Orchard  
Gonocarpus intricatus  (Benth.) Orchard  
Gonocarpus leptothecus  (F.Muell.) Orchard  
Gonocarpus longifolius  (Schindl.) Orchard 
Gonocarpus mezianus  (Schindl.) Orchard  - hairy raspwort 
Gonocarpus micranthus  Thunb.  - creeping raspwort  (subsp. micranthus)
Gonocarpus montanus  (Hook.f.) Orchard - mat raspwort 
Gonocarpus nodulosus  Nees  
Gonocarpus oreophilus  Orchard 
Gonocarpus paniculatus  (Benth.) Orchard  
Gonocarpus pithyoides  Nees 
Gonocarpus pusillus  (Benth.) Orchard 
Gonocarpus pycnostachyus  (F.Muell.) Orchard  
Gonocarpus rotundifolius  Drake  
Gonocarpus rudis  (Benth.) Orchard  
Gonocarpus salsoloides  Reichb. ex Spreng.  
Gonocarpus scordioides  (Benth.) Orchard 
Gonocarpus serpyllifolius  Hook.f.  - flat raspwort 
Gonocarpus simplex  (Britten) Orchard  
Gonocarpus tetragynus  Labill.  - common raspwort 
Gonocarpus teucrioides DC.  - germander raspwort
Gonocarpus trichostachyus  (Benth.) Orchard 
Gonocarpus urceolatus  Orchard 
Gonocarpus vernicosus  Hook.f.

References

 
Saxifragales genera